The 1964 Northwest Territories general election took place on March 31, 1964.

Appointed members

Elected members
For complete electoral history, see individual districts

References 

1964 elections in Canada
Elections in the Northwest Territories
March 1964 events in Canada
1964 in the Northwest Territories